Zaheer Lorgat (born 23 January 1986) is a South African cricketer. He played in three first-class, eight List A, and sixteen Twenty20 matches for Boland from 2013 to 2015.

See also
 List of Boland representative cricketers

References

External links
 

1986 births
Living people
South African cricketers
Boland cricketers
Cricketers from Port Elizabeth